FitzGerald is a large lunar impact crater on the far side of the Moon. It lies to the west-southwest of the crater Cockcroft, and about two crater diameters to the northeast of Morse.

This is an impact crater with features that have become softened and eroded by subsequent impacts in the vicinity. The younger satellite crater FitzGerald W is attached to the exterior along the northwest. Faint ray material extends from the southeastern rim of this satellite across the western floor of FitzGerald, although it is unclear if this impact is the source or if it came from the rayed crater Moore F to the north.

Several smaller craters also lie along the rim of FitzGerald, with a joined pair along the eastern rim and two more along the western edge. The inner walls display some indications of past slumping and terracing, although these features have become smoothed out with time. The interior floor is a nearly level, featureless plain, with some slight irregularities to the northeast.

Satellite craters
By convention these features are identified on lunar maps by placing the letter on the side of the crater midpoint that is closest to FitzGerald.

References

 
 
 
 
 
 
 
 
 
 
 
 

Impact craters on the Moon